Eunanoreenya (previously known as Eunanyhareenyha and Eunonyhareenya) is a rural suburb of Wagga Wagga, New South Wales.

References

External links 

Suburbs of Wagga Wagga